The Griffin-Spalding County School District is a public school district in Spalding County, Georgia, United States, based in Griffin. It serves the communities of East Griffin, Experiment, Griffin, Orchard Hill, and Sunny Side.

Schools
The Griffin-Spalding County School District has eleven elementary schools, four middle schools, and three high schools.

Elementary schools
 Anne Street Elementary School
 Atkinson Elementary School
 Beaverbrook Elementary School
 Cowan Road Elementary School
 Crescent Road Elementary School
 Futral Road Elementary School
 Jackson Road Elementary School
 Jordan Hill Road Elementary School
 Moore Elementary School
 Moreland Road Elementary School
 Orrs Elementary School

Middle schools
 Carver Road Middle School
 Cowan Road Middle School
 Kennedy Road Middle School
 Rehoboth Road Middle School

High schools
 AZ Kelsey Academy
 Griffin High School
 Spalding High School

References

External links

School districts in Georgia (U.S. state)
Education in Spalding County, Georgia